IEEE Transactions on Neural Networks and Learning Systems is a monthly peer-reviewed scientific journal published by the IEEE Computational Intelligence Society. It covers the theory, design, and applications of neural networks and related learning systems. According to the Journal Citation Reports, the journal had a 2021 impact factor of 14.255.

The journal was established in 1990 by the IEEE Neural Networks Council.

Editors-in-chief 
 Yongduan Song (Chongqing University), 2022–present
 Haibo He (University of Rhode Island), 2016–2021
 Derong Liu (University of Illinois), 2010–2015
 Marios M. Polycarpou (University of Cyprus), 2004–2009
 Jacek M. Zurada (University of Louisville), 1998–2003
 Robert J. Marks II (Baylor University), 1992–1997
 Michael W. Roth (Johns Hopkins University), 1991
 Herbert E. Rauch (Lockheed Palo Alto Research Laboratory), 1990

References

External links

Computer science journals
Transactions on Evolutionary Computation
English-language journals
Monthly journals
Publications established in 1990